Nicolai Philip Brøchner Nielsen (born 4 July 1993) is a Danish former racing cyclist, who competed as a professional from 2012 to 2022.

Major results

2014
 1st Stage 2 Tour of the Gila
 3rd Road race, National Under-23 Road Championships
2015
 1st Scandinavian Race Uppsala
 1st Stage 2 (TTT) ZLM Tour
 3rd Zuid Oost Drenthe Classic I
 4th Himmerland Rundt
 5th Dorpenomloop Rucphen
 5th Ronde van Noord-Holland
 5th Velothon Stockholm
2016
 An Post Rás
1st Stages 4 & 8
 3rd Ster van Zwolle
 3rd Arno Wallaard Memorial
 3rd Scandinavian Race Uppsala
 5th Fyen Rundt
 6th GP Horsens
 10th Himmerland Rundt
 10th Memoriał Henryka Łasaka
2017
 1st Himmerland Rundt
 1st Ronde van Overijssel
 1st Scandinavian Race Uppsala
 1st  Mountains classification Danmark Rundt
 1st Stage 1 An Post Rás
 2nd Road race, National Road Championships
 4th Overall Okolo Jižních Čech
 4th Skive–Løbet
 6th Overall Tour de Normandie
 6th GP Horsens
 10th Flèche Ardennaise
2018
 1st  Mountains classification Danmark Rundt
 4th Road race, National Road Championships
2019
 1st Stage 1 Tour de Normandie
 2nd Himmerland Rundt
 4th Scandinavian Race Uppsala
 4th Kalmar Grand Prix
2021
 4th GP Herning

References

External links

1993 births
Living people
Danish male cyclists
People from Vejle Municipality
Sportspeople from the Region of Southern Denmark